Smooth Sax Tribute to Earth, Wind and Fire is a tribute album to  the R&B band Earth, Wind & Fire by Keyboardist Todd Burrell and Keyboard and Saxophone player Walter Chancellor, Jr. The album was released on May 11, 2004 on Tribute Records and was produced by both Burrell and Chancellor, Jr.

Track listing 
"Shining Star" 	  	   4:42 
"Reasons" 	  	           4:32 
"Devotion" 	  	           4:21 
"September"  4:12 
"Can't Hide Love" 	  	   4:17 
"Sing a Song" 	  	   4:08 
"That's the Way of the World	  	4:47 
"Serpentine Fire" 	  	   4:18 
"Let's Groove" 	  	   4:14 
"Getaway 	   4:32

References

2004 albums
Earth, Wind & Fire tribute albums